Temple United FC are a men's amateur adult American soccer club based in Temple, Texas which debuted in the Texas Premier Soccer League (TPSL) in the season 2015/16.

The Temple playing uniform colors are black shirt, white shorts and black socks which keeps with the clubs monochrome theme. The club's crest was designed in part by club owner Jeremiah Connelly and the TPSL's Scottish Vice President Marc Roseblade.

History

Temple United FC was brought about due to its proximity between the larger cities of Austin, San Antonio, Houston and Dallas and owner Jeremiah Connelly wanted the growth that the city of Temple has seen in recent years to be the catalyst for bringing a recognised men's adult team to the area. After seeing this massive progress in the past few years, particularly in the West Temple area,  with a population of about 70,000+ the time was right to implement a plan to bring minor league soccer to the city.

Temple has the only Macy's between San Antonio and Austin and also has the only IMAX theater between the same cities. The downtown area has a handful of nice restaurants and bars that have been around for years and it has a great atmosphere.

There is a lot of soccer played in Temple, good soccer as well and a good potential mix of young and slightly older players. Temple United FC were keen to offer a chance to those players by beginning this journey to another level of play.

On March 11, 2015, owner Jeremiah Connelly joined TPSL League President Brendan Keyes and Temple, Texas city Mayor Danny Dunn to unveil the club crest at Lions Park Soccer Complex.

On March 15, 2015, the club announce a series of 3 open tryouts that would begin the journey of searching for the club's first ever players.

Team Logo

"Greatness Through Humble Beginnings" is something that the club owner believe's and stands by for the future growth of his club.

The owner is of humble beginnings but believes that no matter how successful the club gets, we must never forget where we came from.

Club Badge
The Phoenix is a metaphor to the slogan and how/what this club can do for the community. The colors are really to make a statement, the only metaphorical relation to the crest being that the ashes that the Phoenix arises from, are black and grey.

Kit Unveiling
On August 31, Temple United rolled out a promotional video with the launch of the club's first ever full black and white playing kit.

Texas Premier Soccer League
In September 2015, Temple United joined seven other clubs from across the state to begin the league's third season. Houston Hurricanes FC, Austin Real Cuauhtemoc and Twin Cities FC all remained from the previous season. Other new clubs to the league were Austin Lonestrikers, Brownsville Bravos, San Antonio Generals and Dallas Clash.

The TPSL is sanctioned by US Club Soccer, an affiliate of the United States Soccer Federation (USSF) with the league being operated and managed solely by Brendan Keyes. Each team is owned and operated individually and are responsible for maintaining the league's minimum standards and for raising its own operating revenue.

Year on Year

Coaching staff

Playing Venue

Temple currently play their home matches at Korompai Soccer Complex, 1909 Curtis B Elliott Dr, Temple, Texas 76501.
D'autant plus , une belle victoire contre l'équipe féminine de Lyon 7 buts à 1. Un match qui s'est déroulé dans l'enceinte Texas le 28 octobre 2016.

References

External links

 Official website
  Facebook Page
  Twitter Page

Soccer clubs in Houston
2015 establishments in Texas
Association football clubs established in 2015